The following is a timeline of the history of the city of Essen, Germany.

Prior to 19th century

 845 – Essen Abbey founded (approximate date).
 971 – Mathilde, granddaughter of Otto I becomes abbess of Essen Abbey.
 1012 – Sophia, daughter of Otto II becomes abbottess of the Essen Stift.
 1041 – Essen receives rights to a market.
 1316 – Essen Minster (church) dedicated.
 1390 – Essener Schützenverein (militia) formed.
 1598 – Borbeck Castle rebuilt.
 1736 – Neueste Essendische Nachrichten von Staats- und Gelehrten Sachen (Newest Essen News of State and Learned Matters) newspaper begins publication.
 1797 –  bookseller in business.

19th century
 1802 – Area occupied by Prussian troops.
 1803
 Essen Abbey secularized.
 Franz Dinnendahl builds steam engine.
 1810 – Krupp foundry in business.
 1814 – Town becomes part of Prussia.
 1822 – Town becomes part of the Rhine Province.
 1841 – Simon Hirschland Bank in business.
 1847 – Essen-Bergeborbeck station opens.
 1849 – Population: 8,813.
 1851 – Zollverein Coal Mine begins operating.
 1862 – Essen Hauptbahnhof and Essen-Borbeck station open.
 1866 – Fredebeul & Koenen booksellers in business.
 1870 – Synagogue consecrated.
 1871 – Town becomes part of the German Empire.
 1872 – Neu-Westend developed.
 1873 – Villa Hügel (Krupp residence) built.
 1875 – Population: 54,790.
 1880 – Historical Society for the City and Convent of Essen founded.
 1881
 Essener Turnerbund athletic club formed.
 Beiträge zur Geschichte von Stadt und Stift Essen (journal of city history) begins publication.
 1886 – Photographische Genossenschaft von Essen (photography group) founded.

 1892 – City Theatre opens.
 1893
 Electric tram begins operating.
 Rhenish-Westphalian Coal Syndicate headquartered in Essen.
 1898 – Krupp's Essener Hof (hotel) built.
 1899 – Essen Philharmonic Orchestra founded.

20th century

1900s-1940s

 1901
 Folkwang Museum founded.
 Heinrich Koppers AG in business.
 1905 – Population: 229,270.
 1906
 Essen Art Museum founded.
 Gartenstadt Margarethenhöhe developed.
 1908 – Moltkeviertel development begins.
 1913
 New Synagogue built.
 Albrecht's shop in business (later Aldi chain supermarket).
 1920 – Consulate of Poland opens.
 1922 – Uhlenkrugstadion (stadium) built.

 1923
 Rot-Weiss Essen football club active.
 French troops enter the city.
 1924 – Filmstudio Glückauf (cinema) opens.
 1925 – Essen/Mülheim Airport opens.
 1927 – Grugapark Botanical Garden and Folkwang School for the arts open.
 1928 – Lichtburg Playhouse (cinema) opens.
 1929 – Werden becomes part of city.
 1932 – Zollverein Mine Shaft 12 built.
 1933 – Theodor Reismann-Grone becomes mayor.
 1936 – Consulate of Poland relocated to Düsseldorf.
 1937 – Just Dillgardt becomes mayor.
 1939 – Stadion an der Hafenstraße (stadium) built.
 1942 – March: Bombing of Essen by Allied forces begins.
 1944
 2 January: Schwarze Poth forced labour camp established by the SS. Its prisoners were mostly Russians and Poles.
 17 May: Schwarze Poth forced labour camp converted into a subcamp of the Buchenwald concentration camp.
 August: Humboldtstraße subcamp of the Buchenwald concentration camp established. Its prisoners were mostly Jewish women.
 1945
 March: Schwarze Poth and Humboldtstraße subcamps of Buchenwald dissolved. Prisoners deported to the main Buchenwald camp.
 March: Bombing of Essen by Allied forces ends.
 1946 – City becomes part of North Rhine-Westphalia.
 1948
 Westdeutsche Allgemeine Zeitung (newspaper) begins publication.
 Labour strike.
 1949
 Essen I, Essen II, and Essen III parliamentary districts created.
 Hans Toussaint becomes mayor.

1950s–1990s

 1951 – Amerikahaus built.
 1957 – Roman Catholic Diocese of Essen founded.
 1958 – Grugahalle sports arena opens.
 1961 – Sammlung Industrieform (museum) opens.
 1962 – City hosts the 1962 European Judo Championships.
 1965
 City hosts Bundesgartenschau (national horticulture biennial).
 Little Theatre founded.
 1968 – Essen Motor Show begins.

 1975 – Kettwig becomes part of city.
 1979 – Essen City Hall built.
 1983 – Spiel, world's biggest non-electronic game trade fair begins.
 1988 – Aalto Theatre opens.
 1989 – Annette Jäger becomes mayor.
 1991 – Offener Kanal Essen television begins broadcasting.
 1993 – City hosts the 1993 World Fencing Championships.
 1994 – Stratmanns Theater Europahaus opens.
 1996 – GOP Varieté Essen theatre opens.
 1997 – Red Dot Design Museum active.
 1999
 ThyssenKrupp conglomerate headquartered in city.
 Wolfgang Reiniger becomes mayor.
 2000 – SGS Essen football club formed.

21st century

 2001 – Zollverein Coal Mine Industrial Complex becomes a UNESCO World Heritage Site.
 2003 – University of Duisburg-Essen established.
 2009 – Reinhard Paß elected mayor.
 2010 – City designated a European Capital of Culture.
 2012
 Stadion Essen (stadium) opens.
 Population: 566,862.
 2014 – June: Storm.

See also
 History of Essen
 
 History of the Ruhr, includes timeline
 Urbanization in the German Empire
 Timelines of other cities in the state of North Rhine-Westphalia:(de) Aachen, Bonn, Cologne, Dortmund, Duisburg, Düsseldorf, Münster

References

This article incorporates information from the German Wikipedia.

Bibliography

in English
 
 
 
 
 
 
  (fulltext)

in German

External links

 Europeana. Items about Essen, various dates.

Years in Germany
essen
Essen
essen
 
History of the Rhineland
essen